Lake Victoria, a naturally occurring shallow freshwater lake of the Murray catchment and part of the Murray–Darling basin, is located in the western Riverina region of south western New South Wales, Australia.

The lake feeds back to the Murray River below Lock 7 via Rufus River.

The lake's capacity was increased in the 1920s when an embankment was constructed and regulators were installed to control the release of water. It provides a storage of water to manage the regulated release of agreed minimum flows of water down the Murray into South Australia. Even though Lake Victoria is in New South Wales, it is operated by SA Water, the South Australian water authority, on behalf of River Murray Water, a division of the Murray-Darling Basin Commission.

When full, the lake holds 677 GL, covers an area of 12,200 ha, and has a maximum depth of about 5.5 m.

See also

 Rufus River

References

Victoria
Murray River
Wentworth Shire